The Lufu language is a Yukubenic language of Nigeria is a language still spoken mostly by older adults among the Lufu people of the Takum Local Government Authority, Taraba State; its speakers have mostly shifted to Jukun. It is close to Bete.

Bibliography
 Crozier, David H. and Roger M. Blench, editors. 1992. An index of Nigerian languages. Abuja, Nigeria and Dallas: Nigerian Language Development Centre, Department of Linguistics and Nigerian Languages, University of Ilorin, and Summer Institute of Linguistics.

References

External links

Endangered languages of Africa
Languages of Nigeria
Yukubenic languages
Endangered Niger–Congo languages